Dressed as a Girl is a documentary film of East London’s alternative drag scene, directed by Colin Rothbart, which focuses on both the public and personal lives of some of the key performers on the alternative drag scene.

According to the US/Canadian magazine Vice it has been called a "frockumentary" which, as well as looking at the public face of the drag scene, it tells the personal stories of six of its performers.

Although the film documents the highs and lows of their personal lives as well as their 'on-stage' personas, The Guardian notes that "Once the film-maker returns to his subjects off-hours, however, he identifies as much subtle and cherishable variation as there is among birds of paradise."

Cast 
The film examines the careers and off-stage lives of six London drag queens: Jonny Woo, Scottee, Holestar, Pia, Amber, and John Sizzle

Crew 
Colin Rothbart ... Director | Colin Rothbart ... Producer | Chris Amos ... Producer

Production 
Inspired by Paris Is Burning, Colin Rothbart initially recorded footage of the stars of the documentary performing at the NYC Downlow stage, Glastonbury.

Music 
Original music for the film was provided by Amber Swallowz, Paul Warkworth, Feral Five, The Beef, Black Gold Buffalo, The Dash, Feral Is Kinky, Fil OK, Holestar, Hannah Holland, Jojo De Freq, K-Tron/Sma5H TV (K-Tron, Steve Baker, Rob Burnham, Mama, Per QX, Mama Shamone, Phil Spalding, Nigel Stewart, Jim Warboy, Jon Pleased Wimmin and Jonny Woo

References

External links 
 

Films shot in England
2015 films
British documentary films
Documentary films about London
British LGBT-related films
2015 documentary films
Documentary films about cross-dressing
Drag (clothing)-related films
2015 LGBT-related films
2010s English-language films
2010s British films